Sheikhpura district is one of the thirty-eight districts of the Indian state of Bihar. Sheikhpura is the administrative headquarter of this district. Sheikhpura district is a part of the Munger division. Sheikhpura was split from the Munger district into a separate district with headquarters in Sheikhpura on 31 July 1994 by Rajo Singh. As of 2011 it was the least populous district of Bihar (out of 38).

Geography

Economy
Shekhpura is one of the smallest districts of Bihar. The population of Shekhpura primarily depends on agriculture. Small-scale mining operations of smaller hillocks with crushers is another of the main activities. In 2006 the Ministry of Panchayati Raj named Sheikhpura one of the country's 250 most-impoverished districts. It is one of the 36 districts in Bihar currently receiving funds from the Backward Regions Grant Fund Programme.

Politics 
  

|}

Demographics

According to the 2011 Census of India, Sheikhpura district had a population of 636,342, giving it a ranking of 516th in India. Its population growth rate over the decade 2001–2011 was 20.82%. Sheikhpura had a sex ratio of 926 females for every 1000 males, and a literacy rate of 65.96%. 17.13% of the population lives in urban areas. Scheduled Castes and Scheduled Tribes make up 20.60% and 0.10% of the population respectively.

Languages

At the time of the 2011 census, 56.90% of the population in the district spoke Hindi, 38.17% Magahi and 4.70% Urdu as their first language.

See also 

 Nawada
 Gaya
 Patna
 Begusarai
 Lakhisarai

References

External links 
 Sheikhpura Information Portal
 The official website of Sheikhpura District of Bihar

 
Munger division
Districts of Bihar
1994 establishments in Bihar